Jing Boran (born 19 April 1989) or Bobo Jing, is a Chinese actor and singer who achieved popularity after becoming the champion at the 2007 talent contest My Hero. Along with the third-place winner Fu Xinbo, he formed a boy band called BoBo. Since 2008, Jing has appeared on a series of films and televisions. He is known for his leading roles in Chinese films Monster Hunt (2015), Time Raiders (2016), Us and Them (2018) and The Shadow Play (2019).

Career

2007–2014: Beginnings
Jing began his singing career after winning the top prize at the 2007 Chinese talent contest My Hero. He then signed a contract with Chinese entertainment company Huayi Brothers and formed a boy band named BoBo with fellow contestant Fu Xinbo. In October 2007, the band released their debut EP, Glory. In 2008, he appeared as a minor unaccredited role in the Chinese film The Equation of Love and Death.

Jing made his feature film debut in the Chinese romance film Hot Summer Days (2010), which won him a Best New Actor award at the Beijing College Student Film Festival. Since then, he has developed a passion for acting and started to focus on acting and refining skills by exploring different genres of film. One of his earlier notable roles is Wang Can in the romance film Up in the Wind (2013) where he played a rich second generation heir who wants to find meaning in life.

In June 2011, Jing signed a recording deal with Seed Music, and released his debut eponymous studio album. The album topped the charts in both mainland China and Taiwan, and won him a Global Chinese Golden Chart Award for Best New Artist.

2015–present: Rising popularity and breakthrough
In 2015, Jing started to gain popularity with his role in the time-travel romance drama Love Weaves Through a Millennium and travel reality show Divas Hit the Road; his chemistry and friendship with co-star Zheng Shuang (who also appeared in both programs) was a huge topic online.
Jing then starred in the road drama film Lost and Love alongside Hong Kong actor Andy Lau. His performance as a bike mechanic who was orphaned since young earned him a Golden Rooster Award nomination for Best Supporting Actor. The same year, he starred in the fantasy comedy film Monster Hunt; which grossed over 1.8 billion yuan to become one of the highest-grossing films in China. The success of Monster Hunt successfully launched Jing to mainstream fame.

In 2016, Jing starred in the adventure film Time Raiders, which is based on the novel Tomb Raiders. The film was a box office success, and was the only summer release in China to surpass 1 billion yuan. He then starred in the romance-gaming film Love O2O, which is based on the novel under the same title, alongside Angelababy.

In 2017, it was announced that Jing is set to return to the small screen with fantasy period drama The Love of Hypnosis alongside Liu Yifei.

In 2018, Jing reprised his role in the sequel of Monster Hunt. The same year, he starred in the romance film Us and Them, directed by Taiwanese actress Rene Liu. It was a hit in China, earning $191 million over its first two weekends.

In 2019, Jing starred in the crime suspense film The Shadow Play directed by Lou Ye. The same year, Jing co-starred in the adventure drama film  The Climbers .

Ambassadorship
In 2015, Jing became the youth ambassador for the Youth Creativity Entrepreneur Awards, established by United Nations Human Settlements Programme.

Filmography

Film

Television series

Variety show

Discography

Albums

Singles

Awards and nominations

Forbes China Celebrity 100

References

External links

1989 births
Living people
Chinese male film actors
Chinese male television actors
Chinese Mandopop singers
Chinese people of Russian descent
Male actors from Shenyang
Participants in Chinese reality television series
Singers from Liaoning
Singing talent show winners
21st-century Chinese male actors
21st-century Chinese male singers